Brent Andrew Geiberger (born May 22, 1968) is an American professional golfer who played on the PGA Tour. He is the son of golfer Al Geiberger.

Early life 
Geiberger was born in Santa Barbara, California. He attended College of the Desert in Palm Desert, California, winning eight junior college tournaments. He also attended Pepperdine University in Malibu, California and was a member of the golf team.

Career 
Geiberger turned pro in 1993, and initially played on the Nike Tour. Geiberger has won two PGA Tour events. His first win came in 1999 at the Canon Greater Hartford Open, and his second was at the 2004 Chrysler Classic of Greensboro. He has featured in the top 50 of the Official World Golf Ranking.

In 1998, Geiberger and his father made history when they became the first father-son combination to compete in the PGA Championship. His brother, John, is coach of the Pepperdine University golf team that won the 1997 NCAA Division I Golf Championship.

Geiberger hit the first shot at the first PGA Tour event played in Mexico, the 2008 OHL Classic at Mayakoba.

Geiberger has not played a PGA Tour event since withdrawing from the 2009 Wyndham Championship.

Professional wins (2)

PGA Tour wins (2)

Results in major championships

Note: Geiberger never played in The Open Championship.

CUT = missed the half-way cut
"T" = tied

Results in The Players Championship

CUT = missed the halfway cut
WD = withdrew
"T" indicates a tie for a place

Results in World Golf Championships

1Cancelled due to 9/11

QF, R16, R32, R64 = Round in which player lost in match play
"T" = Tied
NT = No tournament

See also
1996 PGA Tour Qualifying School graduates

References

External links

American male golfers
Pepperdine Waves men's golfers
PGA Tour golfers
Golfers from California
Sportspeople from Santa Barbara, California
People from Palm Desert, California
1968 births
Living people